The Archaeological Museum of Sitia is a museum in Sitia of Crete, in Greece. Its collection consists of Minoan-era finds from Sitia, Zakros, Petra and Palaikastro.

See also
 Palaikastro Kouros

External links
Hellenic Ministry of Culture and Tourism / in Greek
ancient-greece.org
www.interkriti.org
www.planetware.com

Sitia
Buildings and structures in Lasithi